Milanowich is a South Slavic surname. Notable people with the surname include: 

 Fred Milanovich (1915–1997), American politician
 Scott Milanovich (born 1973), American football player and coach

See also
 Milanović

South Slavic-language surnames